Myelois urbicella is a species of snout moth in the genus Myelois. It was described by Nikolay Grigoryevich Erschoff in 1874. It is found in Turkestan.

References

Moths described in 1874
Phycitini